The women's aerials competition of the FIS Freestyle World Ski Championships 2011 was held at Deer Valley, United States on February 3 and 4, 2011 (qualifications and finals).

Qualification
The following are the results of the qualification.

Final
The following are the results of the final.

References

Aerials, women's